Munch is a peanut bar manufactured by Mars, Incorporated and sold in the United States.  The bar was introduced in 1970 as the Snickers Munch Peanut Brittle  Bar and was later relabeled "Munch".  It is made of only seven ingredients: peanuts, sugar, butter, corn syrup, palm oil, salt and soy lecithin.

The candy bar contains no chocolate and is comparable to peanut brittle, though the Munch bar has a higher density of peanuts compared to most brittles.

Due to its short list of simple ingredients, it is marketed as being healthy and natural.

References

External links
 Official website

Candy bars
Mars confectionery brands
Products introduced in 1970